Ralph Emerson Bailey (July 14, 1878 – April 8, 1948) was an American lawyer and politician who served one term as a U.S. Representative from Missouri from 1925 to 1927.

Biography 
Born in Cainsville, Missouri, Bailey moved to Illinois with his parents, who settled in Benton, Franklin County, in 1880.
He attended the graded and high schools at Benton.
He moved to Bloomfield, Missouri, in 1897.
He graduated from the Southeast Missouri Teachers' College (now Southeast Missouri State University) at Cape Girardeau in 1901.
He soon took a special course at the University of Missouri.
He studied law.
He was admitted to the bar in 1907 and commenced practice in Bloomfield, Missouri.
He moved to Sikeston, Missouri in 1910 and continued the practice of law.
He served as City attorney in 1912–1914 and again in 1918–1922.
He served as a member of the board of regents of the Southeast Missouri Teachers' College.

Congress 
Bailey was elected as a Republican to the Sixty-ninth Congress (March 4, 1925 – March 3, 1927).
He was not a candidate for renomination in 1926 to the Seventieth Congress.

Later career and death 
He resumed the practice of law in Sikeston, Missouri.

He died in Cape Girardeau, Missouri, April 8, 1948.
He was interred in the City Cemetery, Sikeston, Missouri.

References

1878 births
1948 deaths
People from Harrison County, Missouri
University of Missouri alumni
People from Sikeston, Missouri
Republican Party members of the United States House of Representatives from Missouri
Southeast Missouri State University alumni
People from Benton, Illinois
People from Bloomfield, Missouri